Bodies is the first novel written by the British doctor-turned-novelist and -scriptwriter Jed Mercurio. It was published in 2002 and formed the basis of the award-winning BBC medical drama Bodies.

References

2002 British novels
British novels adapted into television shows
Jonathan Cape books